2018 Women's European Water Polo Championship Qualifiers are series of qualification tournaments to decide the participants of the 2018 Women's European Water Polo Championship.

Qualified teams
Teams directly qualified to the 2018 European Water Polo Championship:
 – winners of the 2016 Women's European Water Polo Championship
 – runners-up of the 2016 Women's European Water Polo Championship
 – 3rd place of the 2016 Women's European Water Polo Championship
 – 4th place of the 2016 Women's European Water Polo Championship
 – 5th place of the 2016 Women's European Water Polo Championship
 – 6th place of the 2016 Women's European Water Polo Championship

Qualifying round 1

Playoffs
From the qualification rond, six of the seven teams advance to the playoffs. These six teams will face the teams classified 7 to 12 in the latest edition of the tournament, the 2016 Women's European Water Polo Championship

Playoffs
1st leg: 17 and 24 February 2018
2nd leg: 3 March 2018

|}

References 

Women
Women's European Water Polo Championship
Euro
Euro